KWHO (107.1 FM) is a radio station licensed to serve Lovell, Wyoming, United States.  The station is owned by White Park Broadcasting, Inc, a subsidiary of Oregon Trail Broadcasting.

KWHO broadcasts an adult hits music format, and features programming from ABC Radio.

History
This station received its original construction permit from the Federal Communications Commission on March 9, 2005.  The new station was assigned the call sign KROW by the FCC on April 8, 2005.  After one modification and overcoming an informal objection during construction, KROW received its license to cover from the FCC on March 21, 2008.

On January 28, 2010, KROW changed their call letters to KWHO. The former KWHO call letters were previously used by a radio station in Salt Lake City, Utah, now known as KKAT.

Construction permit
On March 23, 2009, KROW was granted a new construction permit authorizing the station to upgrade from class C3 to class C0, increase effective radiated power to 100,000 watts, increase the broadcast antenna's height above average terrain to 427 meters (1401 feet), and relocate its transmitter to the southwest at 44°34'13"N, 108°49'09"W, to better serve the larger market of Cody, Wyoming. The new transmitter and tower site is east of Highway 14A, between Cody and Powell.  This permit expired on March 23, 2012.

References

External links

FCC partial listing of other KROW radio stations

WHO
Adult hits radio stations in the United States
Radio stations established in 2008
Big Horn County, Wyoming
2005 establishments in Wyoming